Lale Öztürk, (born December 1, 1971)  Turkish athlete of long distance and marathon runner. She won the bronze medal in women's marathon at the 1997 Mediterranean Games held in Bari, Italy. 
And also become third in the International Trabzon and Eurasia Marathon. Lale Öztürk represented Turkey in the marathon at the 2004 Summer Olympics in Athens, Greece.
 
Öztürk is married and mother of a daughter. Her husband Zeki Öztürk competed at the middle and long distance running.

References

External links

1971 births
Living people
Turkish female long-distance runners
Turkish female marathon runners
Athletes (track and field) at the 2004 Summer Olympics
Olympic athletes of Turkey
Mediterranean Games bronze medalists for Turkey
Athletes (track and field) at the 1997 Mediterranean Games
Mediterranean Games medalists in athletics
20th-century Turkish sportswomen
21st-century Turkish sportswomen